The list is based on CIA World Factbook estimates for the year 2016. All sovereign states with United Nations membership and territory in Asia are included on the list apart from those who are also members of the Council of Europe. In addition, the list includes the special administrative regions of China (Hong Kong and Macao) and Taiwan. Dependent territories of non-Asian countries are excluded.

List

Regions

See also
List of Asian countries by population

References 

Population Growth Rate
Population Growth Rate, Asia